The Vaccine Act of 1813 was an Act of the Twelfth Congress of the United States to encourage vaccination against smallpox.  It was passed 27 February 1813 and repealed 4 May 1822.  The Act was the first federal law concerning consumer protection and pharmaceuticals.

Dr. Edward Jenner discovered smallpox vaccine in 1796, and hucksters quickly exploited the demand for vaccine by offering fraudulent versions.  The Act made these provisions:
 a federal agent charged with preserving genuine vaccine
 authority for the agent to distribute vaccine to any US citizen
 distribution of legitimate vaccine postage-free (franking privilege)

The Act was repealed in 1822, and the authority to regulate vaccines given to the states.  This repeal was the result of an 1821 outbreak of smallpox in North Carolina, which was traced to samples of smallpox, instead of vaccine, accidentally provided by Dr. John Smith while in the capacity of the federal agent charged with preserving and distributing genuine vaccine.

Text 
The Act is brief (as compared to modern legislation) and is therefore reproduced in its entirety here:

References 

1813 in the United States
United States federal health legislation
Smallpox vaccines